Hillsdale Hamlet Historic District is a national historic district located at Hillsdale in Columbia County, New York.  The district includes 128 contributing buildings, five contributing sites, and two contributing objects. It encompasses the historic core of the hamlet of Hillsdale.

It was listed on the National Register of Historic Places in 2010.

Gallery

References

Historic districts on the National Register of Historic Places in New York (state)
Historic districts in Columbia County, New York
National Register of Historic Places in Columbia County, New York